The Minx is a 2007 film written and directed by independent filmmaker Michael Smith. It was written in collaboration with Vincent Francone and shot on location in Chicago and Hong Kong in late 2005 and early 2006. It was distributed by Echelon Entertainment and was released on DVD in the United States on May 15, 2007. The film's world premiere, held at Schuba's Tavern in Chicago, was a "Recommended" screening by Cine-File, Chicago's guide to independent and alternative cinema.

Plot
The Minx is by turns an action/thriller and a comedy. The film's plot details the adventures of Linnea Chiang, a mild-mannered tobacconist by day and a masked master thief by night; like some modern day Robin Hood, the black vinyl-clad "Minx" robs large corporations and gives the money away to homeless people on the streets of Chicago. Over the course of the film's plot turns, Linnea develops relationships with two very different men: Joseph Van Zwick, the ruthless CEO of the corrupt "World Energy" company, and Edgar Alvarez, an idealistic young reporter for "The Windy City Weekly," Chicago's leading alternative newspaper. In an ironic twist, Edgar is assigned to write a story on the Minx, never dreaming that Linnea, the woman he has become romantically involved with, could be her alter-ego. As both of these men, as well as Chief Inspector Chiapetti of the Chicago police, begin to close in on the Minx's true identity, Linnea is forced to make a decision about her future that will affect the lives of everyone involved.

History
The Minx was shot on a shoestring budget in only ten days over a span of several months. It was made using 24p digital video technology while the cast and crew worked mostly for free. Most of the actors in the movie are well known in the world of Chicago theater, television and independent film; among the cast members are noted thespians Mia Park (host of television's Chic-a-Go-Go), Circus-Szalewski and Duane Sharp (star of Zen Noir). The Minx is dedicated to filmmakers Louis Feuillade and Chor Yuen.

References

External links
 
 
 Worst of Netflix Review

2007 films
American action comedy films
American independent films
American action thriller films
2000s English-language films
2000s American films